Charles A. Bickel (1852 – 1 February 1921) was a prominent architect practicing in Pittsburgh, Pennsylvania.

Bickel was born to a well-to-do family of Columbus, Ohio who sent him to Europe for six years to prepare him for a career in architecture. On his return in 1875, he settled in Pittsburgh, apprenticed with an architect there. In 1885 he opened his independent practice, at first in partnership with J.P. Brennan, a partnership that was soon dissolved. Bickel's practice at its height averaged $3,000,000 a year in billings and was concentrated in commercial structures. He served for a time as architect to the city of Pittsburgh, and designed and built numerous police precinct houses and the Public Safety offices.

Failing health forced him to retire in 1920, and he turned his practice over to his son.

Selected commissions

Many of Bickel's commercial structure were of fireproof construction.
Logan-Gregg Hardware Company building, eight storeys.
Spear & Company, ten storeys
May Building, twelve storeys
German National Bank, 313 Sixth Avenue, downtown Pittsburgh, eight storeys, 1890
Columbia National Bank, ten storeys
Methodist Book Concern building, eight storeys
United Presbyterian Book building, eleven storeys
H. and I Kaufman and I. Kaufman stores, ten and twelve storeys, 1898
Hartje Building, twelve storeys, and three Hartje storeys
B. White Building, eight storeys
Atlantic Financial Building, 1889
Pittsburgh Terminal Warehouse and Transfer Company, 1906
Haines Building, ten storeys
McKay Building, eight storeys
Olympia Theatre
Reymer Brothers Candy Factory at 1425 Forbes Avenue in the Bluff neighborhood of Pittsburgh, 1910
Concordia Club, 1913
Second Presbyterian church, Eighth Street
South Side Market Building at 12th and Bingham Streets in the South Side Flats neighborhood of Pittsburgh, 1915
Frank & Seder Building 1918
Methodist Episcopal Church, Lincoln Avenue
German Savings and Trust Company
Duquesne National Bank
National Ben Franklin Fire Insurance Company Building
Westmoreland Club, in Verona, Pennsylvania
N. Nathan & Brothers Building, Johnstown, Pennsylvania
Number 7 Police Station, 93 S. 13th and 1305 Sarah St

Gallery

Notes

1852 births
1921 deaths
People from Columbus, Ohio
19th-century American architects
Architects from Pittsburgh
20th-century American architects